Ivory Classics is an American classical music record label governed by the Ivory Classics Foundation. The purpose of this foundation, which was established in 1998, is to promote, through charitable and benevolent activities, an appreciation for the art of the piano through its work with the premier audiophile piano label.

Artists having recorded for Ivory Classics include, among others, Earl Wild, Shura Cherkassky, Ann Schein Carlyss, Eric Himy, Moura Lympany, and Igor Lovchinsky.

References

External links 
 Ivory Classics web site

American record labels
Classical music record labels

1998 establishments in the United States
1998 establishments in California